Grinding Gear Games (abb. GGG) is a New Zealand video game developer company founded in 2006 and based in Auckland. A former independent developer, the studio was acquired by Chinese tech company Tencent in May 2018, after the Chinese company had published the studio's sole title, Path of Exile, in China (excluding Hong Kong and Macau). The open-beta build of Path of Exile was released worldwide in January 2013 and the 1.0 version of the game was released in October 2013.

History
Grinding Gear Games games was founded in 2006 in Auckland, New Zealand. The company states that its founding members come from various countries and backgrounds.

GGG developed Path of Exile, which was released on 23 October 2013. During the open beta, from 23 January 2013 to release, more than 46,000 people participated. GGG crowd funded Path of Exile through allowing users to pre-purchase in-game microtransactions ahead of the games launch date. In only 6 days, GGG was able to raise over $245,000. The company is now focusing on releasing for more platforms, more regions, and on creating cosmetic items available for purchase through microtransactions.

In 2018, Tencent became a majority holder in GGG, acquiring 86.67% of the company's shares. Three of the co-founders hold the remaining 13.33%. Two of the co-founders also sit on the board of directors, alongside 3 appointed by Tencent in April 2018.

Games developed

References

External links
 Official website

Video game companies of New Zealand
Video game development companies
Video game companies established in 2006
New Zealand companies established in 2006
Tencent
Companies based in Auckland
New Zealand subsidiaries of foreign companies